The 2015 Prince Edward Island Scotties Tournament of Hearts, the provincial women's curling championship of Prince Edward Island, were held from January 23 to 26 at the Silver Fox Curling & Yacht Club in Summerside, Prince Edward Island. The winning team was the Suzanne Birt rink from Charlottetown who represented Prince Edward Island at the 2015 Scotties Tournament of Hearts in Moose Jaw, Saskatchewan.

Teams

Knockout Draw Brackets

A event

B event

C event

Knockout results

Draw 1
Friday, January 23, 2:00 pm

Draw 2
Friday, January 23, 7:00 pm

Draw 3
Saturday, January 24, 10:00 am

Draw 4
Saturday, January 24, 3:00 pm

Draw 5
Sunday, January 25, 10:00 am

Draw 6
Sunday, January 25, 3:00 pm

Playoffs
Birt must be beaten twice.

Semifinal
Monday, January 26, 1:00 pm

Final
Monday, January 26, 6:00 pm

Unnecessary

References

2015 Scotties Tournament of Hearts
Curling competitions in Prince Edward Island
Sport in Summerside, Prince Edward Island
2015 in Prince Edward Island